The 2003–04 Scottish Third Division was won by Stranraer who, along with Stirling Albion, gained promotion to the Second Division. East Stirlingshire finished bottom.

Table

Top scorers

Attendance

The average attendance for Scottish Third Division clubs for season 2003/04 are shown below:

Scottish Third Division seasons
3
4
Scot